Stephen James Benkovic (born April 20, 1938) is an American chemist. He is Evan Pugh Professor and Eberly Chair in Chemistry at Penn State University. His research has focused on mechanistic enzymology and the discovery of enzyme inhibitors. He was elected to the United States National Academy of Sciences in 1985 and received the National Medal of Science in 2009.

Biography

Early life and education
Benkovic was born in Orange, New Jersey. He earned his B.S. degree in chemistry and an A.B. degree in English literature from Lehigh University in 1960. He earned his PhD in organic chemistry from Cornell University in 1963.

Career
Benkovic was a postdoc at University of California, Santa Barbara. There he and his advisor Thomas C. Bruice developed bioorganic textbooks that focused on enzyme catalysis. He joined the chemistry department at Penn State University in 1965. There, he uses the T4 DNA polymerase as a model system to explain the proficiency of enzymes. He also uses the enzyme dihydrofolate reductase and the pathway for de novo purine biosynthesis to gain insights into enzymatic catalysis.

Awards and distinctions
1977 - Pfizer Award in Enzyme Chemistry from the American Chemical Society
1984 - Fellow of the American Academy of Arts and Sciences
1985 - Elected to the National Academy of Sciences
1998 - Chemical Pioneer Award
2000 - Christian B. Anfinsen Award
2002 - Elected to membership in the American Philosophical Society
2003 - ASBMB–Merck Award
2005 - Nakanishi Prize
2009 - Benjamin Franklin Medal in Life Science
2009 - National Medal of Science
2010 - Ralph F. Hirschmann Award in Peptide Chemistry
2011 - NAS Award in Chemical Sciences

References

External links
Street Corner Science with Stephen Benkovic

1938 births
21st-century American chemists
Cornell University alumni
Fellows of the American Academy of Arts and Sciences
Lehigh University alumni
Living people
Members of the United States National Academy of Sciences
National Medal of Science laureates
Pennsylvania State University faculty
People from Orange, New Jersey
Members of the American Philosophical Society
Members of the National Academy of Medicine